Anthony Paul James Smurfit (born 1963) is a British-Irish businessman. He serves as the CEO of FTSE 100 packaging company Smurfit Kappa Group, which is named after his grandfather, John Jefferson Smurfit.

Early life and career 
Smurfit was born in 1963 in Wigan in Lancashire to businessman Michael Smurfit and Norma Triesman. He attended the Irish St Gerard's School and the American University of Scranton, where he earned a Bachelor of Science degree in management in 1985. Subsequently, Smurfit spent some time in Japan to study the packaging industry.

He joined Smurfit Kappa – then called "Jefferson Smurfit" and led by his father – in the 1980s and was appointed director in 1989. He served in several positions in the United States and Europe including as head of Smurfit France. He became chief operations officer (COO) of the company's European division in 1999 after having been deputy for a year. Smurfit was promoted to COO of the entire company in November 2002.

In September 2015, he was appointed CEO of Smurfit Kappa following the retirement of his predecessor, Gary McGann. Besides, Smurfit is on the boards of the Confederation of European Paper Industries and Ibec, and he is a Mexican honorary consul in Ireland and a member of the European Round Table for Industry. Previously, he had also been a board member of Aer Rianta (1996–2001) and C&C Group (2012–2016).

Personal life 
Smurfit is married to former model and actress Sharon Devlin and has four children. One of his hobbies is horse breeding, having been a member of the Irish National Stud's board.

References 

1963 births
20th-century Irish businesspeople
21st-century Irish businesspeople
Chief executives in the manufacturing industry
Chief operating officers
Honorary consuls
Irish chief executives
People educated at St Gerard's School, Bray
Living people